Said EL Artist is an Egyptian drummer/percussionist. He also has a line of signature drums - El Artist Drums.
He played a huge role for taking Egyptian Shaabi music to be known worldwide and is most known for his release Spectacular Rhythms, on Hollywood Records, but is featured on many recordings.

References

Egyptian drummers
Egyptian percussionists
Living people
Year of birth missing (living people)